Lhatse County (also rendered as Liza County) is a county of Xigazê in the Tibet Autonomous Region. It was established in 1959, with Lhatse Town as the county seat. In 1968, Quxia Town became the county seat.

Lhatse County, has a population of some 50,000 and is about 200 kilometers from Mount Everest (or Chomolungma). It is among the most impoverished counties in China.

Geography 

Yarlung Zangbo River

Towns and townships
 Lhazê Town
 Quxar Town
 Tashi Dzom Township
 Qoima Township
 Püncogling Township
 Tashigang Township
 Liu Township
 Resa Township
 Mangpu Township
 Xiqên Township 
 Chau Township
 482 natural villages

Climate

Transport 
The county is a juncture of China National Highway 219 (G219) which goes to Kashgar and China National Highway 318 (G318) which ends at the border with Nepal. To the west along the G318, a road splits off and runs to the Mount Everest base camp.

References

Counties of Tibet
Shigatse